Berekeh (also Romanized as Barkeh; also known as Sarāb-e Berekeh and Sarāb-e Barkeh) is a village in Dowreh Rural District, Chegeni District, Dowreh County, Lorestan Province, Iran. At the 2006 census, its population was 578, in 126 families.

References 

Towns and villages in Dowreh County